Special team may refer to:
 Special teams in American football, units that are on the field during kicking plays
 Special teams in ice hockey, players on the ice during a power play
Police Special Operation Teams, a law enforcement agency in Turkey